Winterton and Thealby railway station was a station built by the North Lindsey Light Railway in Winterton, Lincolnshire, on their line from Scunthorpe to Winteringham. The station was opened on 3 September 1906 and  closed to passengers in 1925.  The line closed entirely in 1964.

The first train on the line operated from Dawes Lane as far as this station.

References

 NLLR in "The Lincolnshire and East Yorkshire Transport Review"

Disused railway stations in the Borough of North Lincolnshire
Railway stations in Great Britain opened in 1906
Railway stations in Great Britain closed in 1925
Former Great Central Railway stations